Stephen Long may refer to:

 Stephen Harriman Long (1784–1864), American engineer, explorer, and military officer
 Stephen Long (sportsman) (born 1951), former English cricketer and field hockey player
 Stephen P. Long, FRS (born 1950), environmental plant physiologist
 D. Stephen Long, professor of ethics at Southern Methodist University

See also
Steven Long (disambiguation)